Mahipal (1919 -2005) was an Indian actor who worked in bollywood mostly in stunt films like Parasmani, Zabak, Cobra Girl, Jantar Mantar, Arabian nights themed movies such as Alibaba and 40 Thieves, Aladdin Aur Jadui Chirag, Roop Lekha, Sunehari Nagin, Hindu mythological movies like Sampoorna Ramayan, Ganesh Mahima, Veer Bhimsen, Jai Santoshi Maa. He is known for playing the iconic role of Lord Vishnu, and his two avatars, Lord Rama and Lord Krishna in lot of various puranic, Ramayana, Mahabharata, Bhagavata Purana based movies, besides playing Tulsidas and Abhimanyu, and is also best known as the lead in V. Shantaram's Navrang (1959), and the songs "Tu Chhupi Hai Kahan Me Tadapta Yahan" and "baazigar me tu jaadugar". He acted in several well-known films of the 1950s and 1960s including V. Shantaram's Navrang (1959) and Babubhai Mistry's Parasmani (1963).

Biography
He was born in Jodhpur, Rajasthan, where after his schooling, he graduated in literature from Jaswant Government College Jodhpur. Thereafter, he worked in the theatre before migrating to Mumbai in the early 1940s.

He made his film debut in the 1942 film Nazrana. However, the film didn't work, thereafter he wrote lyrics for V. Shantaram for four films.  He went on to work with directors such as Sohrab Modi and later with the Wadia Brothers, Homi Wadia and J. B. H. Wadia, however, it was his work with V. Shantaram that got him lasting acclaim. He worked in several mythological and historical films with actresses such as Nirupa Roy, Mala Sinha and even Meena Kumari. He also did a series of fantasy films based on Arabian Nights, including Alibaba and 40 Thieves (1954), Jennie (1953), Aladdin Aur Jadui Chirag (1952) and Alibaba ka Beta (1955), which gave him popularity even in the Gulf countries. Later in his career, he switched to character roles, and appeared in films such as Jai Santoshi Maa (1975), a 1970s hit.  He died in Mumbai of cardiac arrest, at the age of 86. He was survived by his wife Akkal Kunwar and daughters Shushila Jain and Nirmala Oswal.

Selected filmography

 Nazrana (1942)
 Shankar Parvati (1943)
 Mali (1944)
 Andhon Ki Duniya (1947) .... Kumar
 Banwasi (1948)
 Narasinha Avatar (1949) .... Narad
 Daulat (1949) .... 
 Shri Ganesh Mahima (1950) .... Krishna
Nandkishore (1951)
 Lakshmi Narayan (1951)
 Jai Mahalaxmi (1951)
 Hanuman Patal Vijay (1951)
 Devyani (1952)
 Aladdin Aur Jadui Chirag (1952) .... Aladdin
 Dharma Pathni (1953) .... Manoharlal
 Khoj (1953)
 Husn Ka Chor (1953)
 Tulsidas (1954) .... Ram Bhola / Anami / Tulsidas
 Lal Pari (1954)
 Alibaba Aur 40 Chor (1954) .... Alibaba
 Teen Sardar (1955)
 Tatar Ka Chor (1955)
 Son of Ali Baba (1955) .... Akhtar
 Shah Behram (1955)
 Madhur Milan (1955)
 Jai Mahadev (1955)
 Hatimtai Ki Beti (1955) .... Salim
 Darbar (1955)
 Alladin Ka Beta (1955)
 Shree Krishna Bhakti (1955)
 Riyasat (1955)
 Ratna Manjari (1955)
 Mast Qalandar (1955)
 Mahasati Savitri (1955)
 Chirag-e-Cheen (1955)
 Sultan - E- Alam (1956)
 Sheikh Chilli (1956) .... Shehzada Nissar
 Makkhee Choos (1956) .... Narayan
 Lal E Yaman (1956)
 Khul Ja Sim Sim (1956)
 Husn Banu (1956)
 Sudarshan Chakra (1956)
 Sati Naag Kanya (1956)
 Roop Kumari (1956)
 Raj Rani Meera (1956)
 Lalkaar (1956)
 Caravan (1956)
 Bajrang Bali (1956)
 Aan Baan (1956)
 Sher-E-Baghdad (1957)
 Shahi Bazar (1957)
 Maya Nagri (1957)
 Chamak Chandni (1957)
 Pawan Putra Hanuman (1957)
 Naag Padmani (1957)
 Jannat (1957)
 Janam Janam Ke Phere: Alias Sati Anapurna (1957) .... Lord Vishnu
 Alladdin Laila (1957)
 Teerth Yatra (1958)
 Sim Sim Marjeena (1958)
 Amar Pyar (1958)
 Taxi 555 (1958)
 Raj Sinhasan (1958)
 Maya Bazaar (1958) .... Bhagwan Shri Kishan
 Circus Sundari (1958)
 Al Hilal (1958)
 Akash Pari (1958)
 Tikadambaaz (1959)
 Navrang (1959) .... Divakar
 Dr. Z (1959)
 Chandrasena (1959)
 Rangeela Raja (1960)
 Abdulla (1960) .... Abdulla
 Sampoorna Ramayana (1961) .... Ram
 Pyar Ki Jeet (1962) .... Pundarik
 Zabak (1962) .... Zabak / Hajji
 Shree Ganesh (1962) .... Bhagwan Shri Krishan 'Gopala' 'Kanhaiya' / Bhagwan Shri Ram
 Rooplekha (1962)
 Naag Devata (1962)
 Baghdad Ki Raaten (1962)
 Naag Mohini (1963)
 Naag Jyoti (1963)
 Sunheri Nagin (1963) .... Vijay
 Parasmani (1963) .... Paras
 Maya Mahal (1963)
 Kan Kan Men Bhagwan (1963) .... Jainath
 Dev Kanya (1963)
 Cobra Girl (1963) .... Sagar
 Been Ka Jadoo (1963)
 Baba Ramdev (1963)
 Veer Bhimsen (1964)
 Sati Savitri (1964)
 Roop Sundari (1964)
 Mahasati Behula (1964)
 Jantar Mantar (1964)
 Shahi Raqasa (1965)
 Chor Darwaza (1965)
 Shree Ram Bharat Milap (1965) .... Shree Ram, son of Dashrath
 Shankar Sita Ansuya (1965) .... Ram
 Maharaja Vikram (1965)
 Jahan Sati Wahan Bhagwan (1965) .... Rajkumar Abhikshit
 Naag Mandir (1966)
 Poonam Ka Chand (1967)
 Amar Jyoti (1967)
 Hanuman Chalisa (1969)
 Patthar Ke Khwab (1969)
 Veer Ghatotkach (1970) .... Bhagwan Shri Kishan / Kanhaiya
 Sampoorna Teerth Yatra (1970) .... Uttam
 Shree Krishna Arjun Yudh (1971) .... Bhagwan Krishan
 Brahma Vishnu Mahesh (1971) .... Vishnu
 Shri Krishna Arjun Yudh (1971) .... Shri Krishna
 Mahashivratri (1972)
 Vishnu Puran (1973) .... Bhagwan Sarvashri Vishnu / Ram / Kishan
 Balak Dhruv (1974)
 Mahapavan Teerth Yatra (1975)
 Jai Santoshi Maa (1975) .... Devrishi Narad
 Rani Aur Lalpari (1975)
 Jai Mahalaxmi Maa (1976) .... Vishnu
 Do Chehere (1977)
 Gopal Krishna (1979) .... Bhagwan Vishnu
 Navaratri (1983)
 Sant Ravidas Ki Amar Kahani (1983)
 Jai Baba Amarnath (1983)
 Amar Jyoti (1984) .... (final film role)

References

External links
 

Indian male film actors
People from Jodhpur
Rajasthani people
1919 births
2005 deaths
Male actors in Hindi cinema
20th-century Indian male actors